Peter Henderson is a British record producer and audio engineer. He has produced records by Supertramp, Rush, Paul McCartney, and others. He has two Grammy Award nominations, with one win (Best Engineered Recording - Non-classical in 1979) for Breakfast in America.

References

British record producers
Living people
Year of birth missing (living people)